Loughborough University Science & Enterprise ParkLoughborough University Science  & Enterprise Park - LUSEP
This is a list of science parks in the United Kingdom.

England

South West
Bristol and Bath Science Park – Emersons Green, near Bristol
Electronics & Photonics Innovation Centre (EPIC) – Paignton, Devon
Exeter Science Park – Exeter
Plymouth Science Park – Plymouth
Porton Down – Porton, Wiltshire
Winfrith Technology Centre – Winfrith, Dorset

South East
Begbroke Science Park – Begbroke, near Oxford
Culham Science Centre – Culham, Oxfordshire
Discovery Park Enterprise Zone – Sandwich, Kent
Harwell Science and Innovation Campus – Harwell, Oxfordshire
Kent Science Park – Sittingbourne
Langstone Technology Park – Havant, Hampshire
Milton Park – South Oxfordshire
Oxford Science Park – Oxford
Surrey Research Park – Guildford
University of Reading Science & Technology Centre – Reading
University of Southampton Science Park – Southampton

Greater London
Brunel Science Park – Uxbridge
Lee Valley Technopark – Tottenham
South Bank Technopark – Southwark
The London Science Park at The Bridge – Dartford

East Anglia
Allia Future Business Centre – Cambridge, Peterborough and East London
Babraham Research Campus – Cambridge
BioPark – Welwyn Garden City
Cambridge Research Park – Cambridge
Cambridge Science Park – Cambridge
Cambridge Bio-Medical Campus – Cambridge
Chesterford Research Park – Saffron Walden, Essex
Colworth Science Park – Sharnbrook, Bedfordshire
Cranfield Technology Park – Cranfield, Bedfordshire
Granta Park – Cambridge
Norwich Research Park – Colney, Norwich
Papworth Bioincubator – Cambridge
St John's Innovation Centre – Cambridge
The University of Essex Research Park – Colchester
University of Cambridge West Cambridge site – Cambridge
Writtle University College – Chelmsford

East Midlands
BioCity Nottingham – Nottingham
Loughborough University Science & Enterprise Park - LUSEP – Loughborough
Nottingham Science and Technology Park – Nottingham
University of Nottingham Innovation Park – Nottingham

West Midlands
Birmingham Research Park Ltd – Birmingham
Birmingham Science Park Aston – Aston, Birmingham
Coventry University Technology Park – Coventry
Keele University Science Park – Keel, Staffordshire
Malvern Hills Science Park – Malvern
Staffordshire Technology Park –
University of Warwick Science Park – Coventry
University Science Park, Pebble Mill – Edgbaston, Birmingham
Wolverhampton Science Park – Wolverhampton

North West
Alderley Park – Cheshire
The Heath Business and Technical Park – Runcorn, Cheshire
Lancaster Science Park – Lancaster
Liverpool Innovation Park – Liverpool
Liverpool Science Park – Liverpool
Manchester Science Park Ltd – Manchester
MerseyBio – Liverpool
Sci-Tech Daresbury – Cheshire
Westlakes Science & Technology Park – Cumbria

Yorkshire
Advanced Manufacturing Park – Rotherham
Leeds Innovation Centre – Leeds
Newlands Science Park – Kingston upon Hull
Sheffield Technology Parks – Sheffield
The Sheffield Bioincubator – Sheffield
York Science Park – York
Listerhills Science Park – Bradford
National Agri-Food Innovation Campus – York

North East
NETPark – The North East Technology Park – Sedgefield, County Durham
Sunderland Science Park – Sunderland

Scotland
Aberdeen Science Parks – Aberdeen
Ayrshire Innovation Centre – Irvine
BioQuarter – Edinburgh
Dundee Medipark – Dundee
Dundee Technology Park – Dundee
Edinburgh Technopole – Edinburgh
Elvingston Science Centre – East Lothian
Heriot-Watt University Research Park – Edinburgh
Hillington Park Innovation Centre – Glasgow
Pentlands Science Park – Midlothian
Roslin BioCentre – Midlothian
Scottish Enterprise Technology Park – East Kilbride
Stirling University Innovation Park – Stirling
Tweed Horizons – Melrose
West of Scotland Science Park – Glasgow

Wales
Cardiff Business Technology Centre – Cardiff
Technium – Swansea

Northern Ireland
AURIL – Belfast
Catalyst – Belfast
Ulster Science & Technology Park – Derry
University of Ulster Science Research Parks – Derry

 
 
Economy of the United Kingdom-related lists
Innovation in the United Kingdom
Lists of places in the United Kingdom
United Kingdom education-related lists
United Kingdom science-related lists